Ségoufielle (Segofièla in the Gascon dialect of the Occitan language) is a commune in the Gers department in the Occitanie region of southwestern France.

Geography 
Ségoufielle is situated 40 km to the west of Toulouse in the valley of the Save river, between L'Isle-Jourdain and  Lévignac-sur-Save.

Population

See also
Communes of the Gers department

References

Communes of Gers